Salim Cissé (born 24 December 1992) is a Guinean footballer who plays for Maltese club Marsaxlokk as a forward.

Club career

Early years
Born in Conakry, Cissé started playing football when he was already 18. He moved to Italy with his parents in 2011, to escape the political situation in his homeland, and started playing the sport with lower league side U.S. Arezzo, based in Tuscany.

Académica
In summer 2012, Cissé switched to Portugal, signing for three years with Primeira Liga club Académica de Coimbra. He appeared in 41 official games in his first season as a professional and scored nine goals – second-best in the squad only behind Edinho – netting twice in six appearances in the team's campaign in the UEFA Europa League.

Sporting
Cissé continued in the country for 2013–14, penning a five-year contract with Sporting CP. He spent his first season, however, mainly registered with the reserves in the Segunda Liga.

On 20 January 2014, Cissé was loaned out to fellow top flight side F.C. Arouca until June. Still in that level and still owned by Sporting, he went on to represent Académica and Vitória de Setúbal.

Olhanense
On 31 August 2016, Cissé signed for S.C. Olhanense. He scored twice in the last day of the season to help the hosts defeat F.C. Penafiel 3–1, but they were already relegated to the Campeonato de Portugal after finishing in last place.

Politehnica Iași
In September 2017, Cissé signed with Romanian Liga I team CSM Politehnica Iași on a two-year deal. He scored his first goal for his new club on 24 October, contributing to a 2–1 away win over FC Argeș Pitești in the Cupa României.

Personal life
Cissé is a practicing Muslim.

References

External links

1992 births
Living people
Sportspeople from Conakry
Guinean Muslims
Guinean emigrants to Italy
Guinean footballers
Association football forwards
S.S. Arezzo players
Primeira Liga players
Liga Portugal 2 players
Segunda Divisão players
Associação Académica de Coimbra – O.A.F. players
Sporting CP B players
Sporting CP footballers
F.C. Arouca players
Vitória F.C. players
S.C. Olhanense players
Liga I players
FC Politehnica Iași (2010) players
Football League (Greece) players
Trikala F.C. players
Amarante F.C. players
Anadia F.C. players
Egaleo F.C. players
KF Vllaznia Shkodër players
Marsaxlokk F.C. players
Guinea international footballers
Guinean expatriate footballers
Expatriate footballers in Italy
Expatriate footballers in Portugal
Expatriate footballers in Romania
Expatriate footballers in Greece
Expatriate footballers in Albania
Guinean expatriate sportspeople in Italy
Guinean expatriate sportspeople in Portugal
Guinean expatriate sportspeople in Romania
Guinean expatriate sportspeople in Greece
Guinean expatriate sportspeople in Albania